The Hayworth Theatre is a theater and performing arts venue at 2511 Wilshire Boulevard located in the heart of the MacDoKo Art’s District in the Westlake neighborhood of Los Angeles, California.

History
The building that houses the Hayworth is significant due to its association with Stiles O. Clements of the architectural firm Morgan, Walls & Clements, who designed many other Los Angeles theatres as well as many of the buildings in the Wilshire historical district. The structure is in the Spanish Colonial Revival style, also called the ornate Churrigueresque style.

It originally opened in 1926 as The Masque Theatre, a Vaudeville House.  

On May 26, 1950, it was converted into a movie theater, and rebranded as the Vagabond Theatre. Architect Dwight Gibbs, who is widely recognized as the designer of the renowned Carthay Circle Theatre, was responsible for the transformation.  The interior walls of the theatre were once adorned with murals depicting scenes from silent films. The building also housed a restaurant called Vagabond's House, which was possibly Los Angeles' first Tiki bar.

During its peak, it was one of the city's most popular revival houses, but the advent of video almost led to its downfall in the late 1980s. Despite this, the theater managed to remain open into the 1990s, showing classic 3-D films like "Kiss Me Kate" and "Dial M for Murder."

The Hayworth Theatre Company became resident in 2006.The theatre housed award-winning theater company The New American Theatre from 2006 to 2011. Artistic Director and actor Jack Stehlin performed there, as well as other notable actors such as Alfred Molina, Katie Lowes, Jill Gascoine, and Robert Cicchini.

TV writer Jenji Kohan purchased the building in November 2013. Her husband and business partner, Christopher Noxon, indicated that she is planning on using the second floor as production offices for writers and editors on her TV shows. In 2015 the building was renovated by architect Linda Brettler and associate Lydia Dubois-Wetherwax to become production and writing offices maintaining the historical elements of the original building.  Two years later they renovated the theater space.

In 2017, former Hollywood Improv booker and artistic director Jamie Flam launched a Kickstarter campaign to reopen the venue under the name Dynasty Typewriter. Operating as a hub for comedy, variety, screenings, and more, the new venue launched in January 2018 and has since hosted a multitude of shows and events, including notable performances by comedians Hannah Gadsby, Adam Sandler, Ilana Glazer, Patton Oswalt, and Margaret Cho.

Film location 
Throughout its history, the venue has been used as a location for a number of significant film + television productions:

 Satirical Comedy Naked Gun, starring Leslie Neilson & Priscilla Presley
 Mystery/Thriller The Formula, starring George C. Scott
 Musical/Comedy La La Land starring Ryan Gosling & Emma Stone 
 Horror Comedy, Too Late, starring Ron Lynch, Allyssa Limperis, and Fred Armisen

Comedy Specials + Notable events 
Under the Dynasty Typewriter tenure, the venue has been utilized as a filming location for a significant number of comedy specials from various production companies and networks,Netflix, Comedy Central, HBO, and more.

 Adam Sandler: 100% Fresh
 Esther Povitsky: Hot for My Name
 Eddie Pepitone: For the Masses
 Mark Normand — Out To Lunch

References

External links
Dynasty Typewriter Website

Theatre companies in Los Angeles
Arts organizations established in 2006
Cinemas and movie theaters in California
Theatres in Los Angeles
Los Angeles Historic-Cultural Monuments
Theatres completed in 1926
Spanish Colonial architecture in California
1926 establishments in California
2006 establishments in California